The 2005–06 season was the 73rd in the history of AS Saint-Étienne and their second consecutive season in the second division. The club participated in Ligue 1 and the Coupe de France.

Players

Transfers

Pre-season and friendlies

Competitions

Overall record

Ligue 1

League table

Results summary

Results by round

Matches

Coupe de France

Coupe de la Ligue

References 

AS Saint-Étienne seasons
Saint-Étienne